Fuse Mediation Router is an open source tool for integrating services using Enterprise Integration Patterns based on Apache Camel for use in enterprise IT organizations. It is certified, productized and fully supported by the people who wrote the code. Fuse Mediation Router uses a standard method of notation to go from diagram to implementation without coding.

Fuse Mediation Router is a rule-based routing and process mediation engine that combines the ease of basic POJO development with the clarity of the standard Enterprise Integration Patterns. It can be deployed inside any container or be used stand-alone, and works directly with any kind of transport or messaging model to rapidly integrate existing services and applications.

Fuse Mediation Router is now a part of Red Hat JBoss Fuse.

Tooling
FuseSource offers graphical, Eclipse-based tooling for Apache Camel for download.

See also
Message-oriented middleware
Enterprise messaging system
Enterprise Integration Patterns
Service-oriented architecture
Event-driven SOA

External links
JBoss Fuse (Enterprise ServiceMix) web site
CamelOne Conference
Apache ServiceMix getting started resources
Apache ServiceMix web site
JBoss Fuse (Enterprise ServiceMix)  documentation
JBoss Fuse (Enterprise ServiceMix) forums
JBoss Fuse (Enterprise ServiceMix) support
JBoss community web site

Free software distributions
Web services
Web applications